8 Seconds is a 1994 American contemporary Western biographical drama film directed by John G. Avildsen. Its title refers to the length of time a bull rider is required to stay on for a ride to be scored. The film stars Luke Perry as American rodeo legend Lane Frost and focuses on his life and career as a bull riding champion. It also features Stephen Baldwin as Tuff Hedeman, and Red Mitchell as Cody Lambert.

The film was completed and premiered shortly after what would have been Frost's 30th birthday, in late 1993.

Plot
While growing up in Oklahoma, Lane Frost learns the tricks of the bull riding trade at the hand of his father Clyde, an accomplished bronc rider himself. As he grows older, Lane travels the professional rodeo circuit with his best friends Tuff Hedeman and Cody Lambert. He meets and falls in love with a barrel racer, Kellie Kyle, and they eventually marry in 1984.

As Lane's legend and fame increase, so does the amount of pressure he puts on himself, to be what everyone wants him to be, and he wants to show that he is as good as they say he is. His ascent to the 1987 Professional Rodeo Cowboys Association bull riding world championship is marred by a cheating incident, questions about Kellie's devotion, and a near broken neck. The film also follows him through the true life series between himself and Red Rock, a bull that no cowboy had ever been able to stay on for eight seconds. It cuts the series down to three rides. In 1989, Lane is the second-to-last bull rider during the last day of that year’s Cheyenne Frontier Days Rodeo. He successfully rides the bull named Takin' Care of Business for eight seconds and dismounts, but the bull turns back and hits him in the side with a horn, breaking some ribs and severing a main artery. As a result of excessive internal bleeding, Lane dies on the arena floor before he can be transported to the hospital.

The final scene shows Hedeman later that same year at the National Finals Rodeo riding for the world championship. After the eight-second bell sounds, he continues to ride and stays on an additional eight seconds as a tribute to his fallen best friend, who will never be forgotten.

Cast
 Luke Perry as Lane Frost
 Cameron Finley as young Lane Frost
 Stephen Baldwin as Tuff Hedeman
 Red Mitchell as Cody Lambert
 Cynthia Geary as Kellie Kyle Frost
 James Rebhorn as Clyde Frost
 Carrie Snodgress as Elsie Frost
 Linden Ashby as Martin Hudson
 Ronnie Claire Edwards as Carolyn Kyle
 Renée Zellweger as Buckle Bunny
 George Michael as Himself
 Brooks & Dunn as Themselves
 McBride & the Ride as Themselves
 Vince Gill as Himself
 Karla Bonoff as Herself

Production
Filming took place in mainly in Boerne, Texas, Del Rio, Texas, Tucson Rodeo Grounds, San Antonio and Pendleton, Oregon and a handful of other minor locations.

Release
8 Seconds was released in the United States on February 25, 1994. In the Philippines, the film was released on September 8, 1994, with free "Luke Perry handkerchiefs" handed out to moviegoers who present the film's newspaper ad at the lobby of any theater; the film was promoted as being the first American film to be given by the Movie and Television Review and Classification Board's (MTRCB) an "Excellent" rating.

Critical response
The film gained a mixed reception. 
The Milwaukee Journal Sentinel praised Perry's acting but criticized the performance of Cynthia Geary, who played Kellie Frost. It holds a 31% rating from Rotten Tomatoes based on 13 reviews.

Soundtrack

References

External links

1994 films
1990s biographical drama films
American biographical drama films
Biographical films about sportspeople
Country music films
1990s English-language films
Films directed by John G. Avildsen
Films produced by Danny DeVito
Films scored by Bill Conti
Films shot in Oregon
Films shot in San Antonio
New Line Cinema films
Rodeo in film
1994 drama films
1990s American films